Josef Felix Müller (born December 10, 1955) is a Swiss sculptor, graphic artist and painter. Since 1975 he has lived and worked in the Swiss town of Sankt Gallen.

References

This article was initially translated from the German Wikipedia.

20th-century Swiss painters
Swiss male painters
21st-century Swiss painters
21st-century Swiss male artists
1955 births
Living people
20th-century Swiss male artists